The El-Infitah Movement is a minor political party in Algeria, led by Naima Farhi.

History and profile
The party was established as the Algerian National Youth Movement in 1997. It was renamed as El Infitah before the 2007 elections. It has a nationalist and progressive political leaning. Its president is Omar Bouacha and the secretary general is Naima Farhi.

In the 17 May 2007 People's National Assembly elections, the party won 3 out of 389 seats.

References

1997 establishments in Algeria
Political parties established in 1997
Political parties in Algeria